The 2018 MBC Plus X Genie Music Awards ceremony, organized by MBC Plus and Genie Music, took place on November 6, 2018, at Namdong Gymnasium in Incheon, South Korea. This is the first MGA ceremony.

BTS, Wanna One, and Twice took home the grand prizes, also known as the "Daesang Awards".

Attendees, performers and presenters 
Jun Hyun-moo hosted the show. Day6, Momoland, Chungha, Stray Kids, Heize, (G)I-DLE, Jung Seung-hwan are among the attendees of the show and won.

Performers 
 Celeb Five and Akane Kikaku – "I Wanna Be a Celeb"
 Charlie Puth – "See You Again"
 BTS and Charlie Puth – "We Don't Talk Anymore" and "Fake Love"
 Vibe, Ben, and 4Men's Kim Won-joo – "I Can't". "Love, ing" and "Please Come Back Again"
 Twice – "Heart Shaker", "What Is Love", "Dance the Night Away", and "Yes or Yes"
 Wanna One – "To Be One", "Nothing Without You", "I'll Remember", "Light" and "Beautiful"
 BTS – "Save Me", "I'm Fine" and "Idol"

Presenters 

 Pyo Ye-jin
 Lee Ji-hoon
 Seol In-ah
 Yeo Hoe-hyun
 Moon Gabi
 BJ Banzz
 Fukushi Sota

 Kim Ho-young
 Kang Han-na
 Kim Kwon
 Jo Woo-ri
 Shin Ah-young
 Jo Hyun-jae
 Lee Hyun-yi

Judging criteria

Winners and nominees
Winners are listed first and highlighted in boldface. Voting took place on the Genie Music website from October 1, 2018, through October 31, 2018.

Other Awards

 MBC Plus Star Award – Wanna One
 Best Global Performance – Twice
 Best Producer – Bang Si-hyuk
 Best Pop Artist – Charlie Puth
 MGA Best Choreographer – Son Sung-deuk (BTS' Idol)

References

South Korean music awards
Annual events in South Korea
2018 establishments in South Korea